Apteka is a Polish rock band, founded in 1983 in Gdynia.  Their LP "Narkotyki" won "Płyta Roku" ("LP of the Year") of Gazeta Wyborcza in 1992.

The word "apteka" means "drug store" in Polish.

Discography

Studio albums

Live albums

References
 

Musical groups established in 1983
Polish rock music groups
1983 establishments in Poland